Nyceryx ericea is a moth of the family Sphingidae first described by Herbert Druce in 1888. It is found from Panama, Guatemala and Costa Rica to Brazil and Bolivia.

It can be distinguished from all other Nyceryx species by the semitransparent spots in the distal half of the forewing and the tornal area of the hindwing, as well as the yellow base to the hindwing upperside.

Adults are probably on wing year round.

References

Nyceryx
Moths described in 1888